Hot Tamale Baby is the fourth studio album by American blues musician Marcia Ball, released in April 1985 by Rounder Records.

Track listing
"Never Like This Before" (Isaac Hayes, Booker T. Jones, David Porter) – 2:55
"I'm Gonna Forget About You" (O. V. Wright) – 2:54
"Love's Spell" (Marcia Ball) – 3:59
"I Don't Know" (Gene Barge, Laura Lee) – 2:17
"Hot Tamale Baby" (Clifton Chenier) – 3:06
"That's Enough of That Stuff" (Marcia Ball) – 4:27
"Don't You Know I Love You" (Alvin Tyler) – 2:06
"Another Man's Woman" (Marlin Greene, George Jackson, Dan Penn) – 4:20
"If I Ever Needed Love" (Jimmy Oliver) – 3:41
"Uh Uh Baby" (Henry Glover, Rose Marie McCoy) – 2:16

"Hot Tamale Baby" was track 1, side 2 on Clifton Chenier's album Boogie 'n' Zydeco, released on Rounder Records in 1980.

References

External links

1985 albums
Blues albums by American artists
Marcia Ball albums
Rounder Records albums